James McBride (born September 11, 1957) is an American writer and musician. He is the recipient of the 2013 National Book Award for fiction for his novel The Good Lord Bird.

Early life
McBride's father, Rev. Andrew D. McBride (August 8, 1911 – April 5, 1957) was African-American; he died of cancer at the age of 45. His mother, Ruchel Dwajra Zylska (name changed to Rachel Deborah Shilsky, and later to Ruth McBride Jordan; April 1, 1921 – January 9, 2010), was a Jewish immigrant from Poland. James was raised in Brooklyn's Red Hook housing projects until he was seven years old and was the last child Ruth had from her first marriage, the last child of Rev. Andrew McBride, and the eighth of 12 children.

McBride states:

His memoir, The Color of Water: A Black Man's Tribute to His White Mother (1995), describes his family history and his relationship with his mother.

McBride graduated from Oberlin College in 1979, and received his journalism degree from Columbia University Graduate School of Journalism in 1980.

Career

Books and screenplays
McBride is well known for his 1995 memoir, the bestselling book The Color of Water, which describes his life growing up in a large, poor American-African family led by his white Jewish mother. She was strict and the daughter of an Orthodox rabbi. During her first marriage, to Rev. Andrew McBride, she converted to Christianity and became a devout Christian. The memoir, which won an Anisfield-Wolf Book Award, spent over two years on The New York Times bestseller list, and has become an American classic. It is read in high schools and universities across America, has been translated into 16 languages, and sold more than 2.1 million copies.

In 2002, McBride published a novel, Miracle at St. Anna, drawing on the history of the overwhelmingly African-American 92nd Infantry Division in the Italian campaign from mid-1944 to April 1945. The book was adapted into the 2008 movie Miracle at St. Anna, directed by Spike Lee.

In 2005, McBride published the first volume The Process, a CD-based documentary about life as lived by low-profile jazz musicians.

His 2008 novel Song Yet Sung is about an enslaved woman who has dreams about the future, and a wide array of freed black people, enslaved people, and whites whose lives come together in the odyssey surrounding the last weeks of this woman's life. Harriet Tubman served as an inspiration for the book, which gives a fictional depiction of a code of communication that enslaved people used to help runaways attain freedom. The book, based on real events that occurred on Maryland's Eastern Shore, also featured notorious criminal Patty Cannon as a villain.

In 2012, McBride co-wrote and co-produced Red Hook Summer (2012) with Spike Lee.

In July 2013, McBride co-authored Hard Listening (2013) with the rest of the Rock Bottom Remainders (published by Coliloquy). In August 2013, his The Good Lord Bird, a novel, was released by Riverhead Books. The work details the life of notorious abolitionist John Brown. It won the 2013 National Book Award for fiction.

On September 22, 2016, President Barack Obama awarded McBride the 2015 National Humanities Medal "for humanizing the complexities of discussing race in America. Through writings about his own uniquely American story, and his works of fiction informed by our shared history, his moving stories of love display the character of the American family."

In December 2020, Emily Temple of Literary Hub reported that his novel Deacon King Kong had made 16 lists of the best books of 2020, while in February 2021 it won the Andrew Carnegie Medal for Excellence in Fiction. Deacon King Kong received the 2021 Anisfield-Wolf Book Award for fiction.

Saxophonist and composer
McBride is the tenor saxophonist for the Rock Bottom Remainders, a group of best-selling authors who are also musicians. "Hopefully", McBride says, "the group has retired for good." He also toured as a saxophonist with jazz legend Little Jimmy Scott and has his own band that plays an eclectic blend of music. He has written songs for Anita Baker, Grover Washington Jr., Pura Fé, and Gary Burton. McBride composed the theme music for the Clint Harding Network, Jonathan Demme's New Orleans documentary Right to Return, and Ed Shockley's off-Broadway musical Bobos .

McBride was awarded the American Music Theater Festival's Stephen Sondheim Award in 1993, the American Arts and Letters Richard Rodgers Award in 1996, and the inaugural ASCAP Richard Rodgers Horizons Award in 1996.

Personal life
McBride is a Distinguished Writer-in-Residence at New York University. He has three children with his ex-wife and lives in New York City and Lambertville, New Jersey.

Bibliography
 The Color of Water: A Black Man's Tribute to His White Mother (1995)
 Miracle at St. Anna (2002)
 Song Yet Sung (2008)
 The Good Lord Bird (2013)
 Kill 'Em and Leave: Searching for James Brown and the American Soul (2016)
 Five-Carat Soul (2017)
 Deacon King Kong (2020)

Filmography
 Miracle at St. Anna (2008)
 Red Hook Summer (2012)

References

External links

 Curry, Ginette. "Toubab La!": Literary Representations of Mixed-race Characters in the African Diaspora.Cambridge Scholars Pub., Newcastle, England.2007 .
McBride's official website

 James McBride's Advice For New Writers: 'A Simple Story Is The Best Story'. Author Interviews: 29 minute audio with transcript, Fresh Air, NPR, March 5, 2021.

21st-century American novelists
1957 births
African-American novelists
American male journalists
Journalists from New York City
American male novelists
21st-century American memoirists
American jazz saxophonists
American male saxophonists
American people of Polish-Jewish descent
Living people
Musicians from New York (state)
National Book Award winners
Oberlin College alumni
People from Lambertville, New Jersey
Rock Bottom Remainders members
Writers from Brooklyn
New York University faculty
National Humanities Medal recipients
21st-century American male writers
People from Red Hook, Brooklyn
Novelists from New York (state)
Novelists from New Jersey
Jewish jazz musicians
21st-century American essayists
Jazz musicians from New York (state)
21st-century American saxophonists
21st-century American male musicians
American male jazz musicians
African-American Jews
Columbia University Graduate School of Journalism alumni
21st-century African-American musicians
20th-century African-American people